The École nationale des sciences appliquées d'Oujda or ENSA d'Oujda is a Moroccan Grande École d'Ingénieurs, part of the network of ENSA.

History
ENSAO was founded in 1999 to train highly qualified engineers. It is located in Oujda.

Academics
The training lasts 5 years. ENSAO and is divided into two cycles:

Preparatory cycle (2 years)
During this cycle, the emphasis is on the basic engineering sciences (mathematics, physics, chemistry, mechanics and software) and then gradually, the curriculum is open to more specialized areas in science and technology. This cycle allows general preparatory student engineers(ENSAistes) acquire a solid background in terms of skills and competencies, thereby facilitating a career change regardless of their initial specialization.

The first cycle is the most selective training. During the first two years, the exams are very difficult to test whether the student is actually able to continue his engineering studies.

Engineering cycle (3 years)
At the end of the second year of study, engineering students choose a specialty among the six offered by the school, the award of specialty choices is ranked by students' merits

Admissions
Admission to ENSA Oujda is done through a selective competitive exams- written and oral interview- during the year of the bac:

A preselection of candidates on the basis of the average obtained  in their baccalaureat degree.
A contest are invited shortlisted candidates.

It is possible to enter the school's engineering cycle via bac +2 level, through competitive exam and interviews based on knowledge and motivation. The training lasts for 3 years the after 2 years post-BAC. This type of admission is open to students from preparatory classes, universities, or scientific undergraduate degree courses.

Programmes offered

Software engineering
Electrical engineering
Industrial engineering
Telecommunications and Networks
Electronics and Industrial Computing and
Cyber Security Engineering

Forum ENSAO-Enterprise

Since its first edition in 2005, The Forum "ENSAO-ENTREPRISE" imposed its value and is marked with an undeniable national reputation . It offers both engineering students, businesses and multinationals a valuable opportunity to meet and to ensure a fluid opening on topics concerning engineering in its socio-economic context. In fact, the National School of Applied Sciences Oujda place in a region that encourages ambitious investment and today has known major projects such as the "Technopole" of Oujda, the thermal power plant of Ain Bni Mathar and tourism in Saïdia, projects that graduates of this great school surely participate.

References

External links
 ENSA Oujda

Engineering universities and colleges
Universities in Morocco
Educational institutions established in 1999
1999 establishments in Morocco
20th-century architecture in Morocco